The Žilina Region is one of the eight Slovak administrative regions and consists of 11 districts (okresy) and 315 municipalities, from which 18 have a town status. The region was established in 1923, however, in its present borders exists from 1996. It is a more industrial region with several large towns. Žilina is the region administrative center and there is a strong cultural environment in Martin.

Geography
It is located in northern Slovakia and has an area of 6,804 km2 and a population of 688,851 (2011). The whole area is mountainous, belonging to the Western Carpathians. Some of the mountain ranges in the region include Javorníky, the Lesser Fatra and the Greater Fatra in the west, Oravská Magura, Chočské vrchy, Low Tatras and Western Tatras in the east. Whole area belongs to the Váh river basin. Some of its left tributaries are Turiec and Rajčanka rivers and its right tributaries Belá, Orava and Kysuca. National parks on the region's territory are the Lesser, Greater Fatra, Low Tatras and Tatra; landscape protected areas are Strážovské vrchy, Kysuce and Horná Orava. The region borders Prešov Region in the east, Banská Bystrica Region in the south, Trenčín Region in the south-west and west, Czech Zlín Region and Moravian-Silesian regions in the north-west and Polish Silesian and Lesser Poland voivodeships in the north and north-east.

History
After the fall of Great Moravia in the early 9th century, the area became part of the Kingdom of Hungary in the 11th century practically to 1920. Before the break it was part of the Hungarian counties of Trencsén, Turóc, Árva and Liptó. After incorporation into Czechoslovakia, the counties continued to exist under their Slovak names of Trenčín, Turiec, Orava and Liptov, but only to 1923, when they were replaced by (grand) counties ((veľ)župy) From 1928 it was part of the administrative unit "Slovak Land". During the WWII Slovak Republic, the area was split between Trenčín and Tatra counties.  Since 1928 it was part of the administrative after reincorporation into Czechoslovakia in 1945, the pre-war state was restored. In 1949-1960 there was a unit with the name Žilina Region but it was abolished in 1960 and the area became part of new Central Slovak Region, of which it was part until 1990 (except 1969-70) when it was abolished. After the independence of Slovakia in 1993, the current region was established in 1996. Since the administrative regions became autonomous in 2002, it is governed by the Žilina Self-Governing Region.

Demographics

The largest towns are Žilina, Martin, Liptovský Mikuláš, Ružomberok, Čadca and Dolný Kubín . The level of urbanization is relatively low, with about 50% of the population living in the towns, with the Námestovo District having the lowest urbanization in the whole of Slovakia, only 15%. According to the 2001 census, there were 692,332 inhabitants in the region, almost wholly Slovaks (97.5%), with small minorities of Czechs (<1%) and Roma (<0.5%).

Economy 

From the stagnation in the 1990s the region now enjoys relative prosperity. The main employers are industry and tourism. The river Váh valley, which runs across the entire region, forms a strong industrial base with wood pulp and engineering factories as well as Volkswagen and Kia plants in Žilina and Martin.

Politics
Current governor of Žilina region is Erika Jurinová (OĽaNO) - first woman in this office in Slovakia. She won with 32 %. In election 2022 was elected also regional parliament :

Parliamentary groups were formed after the elections. Their status in August 2022 is as follows :

Administrative divisions
The region is divided into 11 districts. There are 315 municipalities in the region of which 18 are towns.

Notes

References

External links
Žilinský samosprávny kraj Official website

 
Regions of Slovakia